Mohja Kahf (born 1967 in  Damascus) is a Syrian-American poet, novelist, and professor. She authored Hagar Poems which won honorable mention in the 2017 Book Awards of the Arab American National Museum. She is the recipient of Pushcart Prize for her creative nonfiction essay, "The Caul of Inshallah" and the Arkansas Arts Council Individual Artist Fellowship in 2002 for poetry. Her poetry has been featured in the installments of American neo-conceptual artist Jenny Holzer.

Early life
Kahf was born in Damascus, Syria. In March 1971, at the age of three and a half, she moved to the United States. She grew up in a devout Muslim household. Both of her parents came to the United States as students at the University of Utah. Kahf and her family moved to Indiana after her parents received their university degrees. When she was in the tenth grade, she and her family moved to New Jersey. In 1984, Kahf lived in Iraq for a brief time. During college, she did one semester as a visiting student at King Abdulaziz University in Jeddah, Saudi Arabia.

Kahf’s maternal grandfather was a member of the Syrian parliament in the 1950s, but was exiled from Syria because of his opposition to the Baathist regime. Her father was a member of the Muslim Brotherhood, an organization that was banned in Syria, and was exiled from Syria as a result.

Kahf graduated from Douglass College in 1988 and later received her Ph.D. in comparative literature from Rutgers, the State University of New Jersey in 1994. In 1995 she became a professor at the University of Arkansas where she serves in the Program for Comparative Literature and Cultural Studies, and is a faculty member in the King Fahd Center for Middle East and Islamic Studies at the University of Arkansas, Fayetteville.

During her work at Rutgers, Kahf taught theories of feminism, Palestinian resistance women, and Black Power movement women. After her move to Arkansas, Kahf served for a time on the board of the Ozark Poets and Writers Collective, participated in local poetry slams and, after winning a spot on "Team Ozarks" with Brenda Moossy, Lisa Martinovic, and Pat Jackson,
represented the region with the all-women team at the 1999 National Poetry Slam in Chicago,

Kahf was a founding member of RAWI, the Radius of Arab American Writers, established in 1993 Kahf is currently a member of the Syrian Nonviolence Movement.
In 2011, Kahf and her daughter visited the Turkish border to Syria in order to work with Syrian escapees. Kahf wrote about the experience in the essay "The Daughter's Road to Syria."

Kahf has attended marches protesting the United States' War on Iraq.

Literary career
Kahf's work explores themes of cultural dissonance and overlap between Muslim American and other communities, both religious and secular.  Syria, Islam, ethics, politics, feminism, human rights, the body, gender, and erotics often feature in her work. In her poetry book Emails From Schherazad, Kahf explores many different Arab and Muslim identities and practices, frequently using humor. She reconfigures many female figures of the Islamic tradition, particularly in  Hagar Poems.

Hagar Poems won honorable mention in the 2017 Book Awards of the Arab American National Museum.  Kahf won a Pushcart Prize for her creative nonfiction essay, "The Caul of Inshallah," about the difficult birth of her son, first published in River Teeth in 2010. Kahf's first book of poetry, E-mails From Scheherazad, was a finalist for the 2004 Paterson Poetry Prize. Her novel The Girl in the Tangerine Scarf was a "One Book" reading at Indiana University East (Richmond, Indiana) in 2017. The novel was chosen as Book Sense Reading Group Favorite for June 2007 and as book of the year for the One Book, One Bloomington Series by the Bloomington Arts Council, Monroe County Public Library, Bloomington, Indiana, 2008.  Kahf won the Arkansas Arts Council Individual Artist Fellowship in 2002 for poetry.

In 2004, Kahf had a column exploring sexual topics on the progressive Muslim website MuslimWakeUp!.com. The column was called "Sex and the Umma" and featured short stories by her, who also hosted guest writers on the column, including Randa Jarrar, Michael Muhammad Knight, and Laila Al-Marayati. The original first column published, a short story by Kahf, "Lustrous Companions," was later re-published on the website loveinshallah.com. Kahf's work on "Sex and the Umma"
"earned her a torrent of attacks...the author, though at once playful and mischievous verbally and thematically, seems to be putting across an alternative image of Islam...a more progressive...one" says Layla Maleh.

Kahf's poetry has featured in the installments of American neo-conceptual artist Jenny Holzer. Her poem "Two Friends Like Fireflies" was set to music composed by Joseph Gregorio, commissioned by the Women's Commission Consortium of the American Choral Director's Association, and premiered by the Soli Deo Gloria Women's Chorale. Kahf's work has been translated into Japanese, Italian, and Arabic. Her poetry features in the BBC documentary, Poems from Syria.

Published works

Poetry 
Hagar Poems, 2016, University of Arkansas Press
E-mails from Scheherazad 2003, University Press of Florida
 my lover feeds me grapefruit. 2020. press 53.

Poems in journals and anthologies
"Nine November 2016 in the U.S. of A." Poem (Routledge), Issue 2-3, 2017.
"Aleppo the Necklace Broke All the Words Fell Apart" & "Flora Fauna Syria," Sukoon: Arab-Themed Art & Literature
"My People Are Rising" Mizna: Prose, Poetry, and Art Exploring Arab America, Vol. 13, Issue 1, pp. 4–6. April 2012.
"Brenda Unbound", Banipal, Magazine of Modern Arab Literature, #38. London. pp. 50–52.
"Little Mosque Poems." Journal of Pan African Studies, 2010, Vol. 4 Issue 2, p106-113.
"Asiya's Aberrance," I Go to the Ruined Place: Contemporary Poems in Defense of Global Human Rights, ed. Melissa Kwasny & M.L. Smoker. Lost Horse Press, 2009. pp. 55–57.
"Asiya Is Waiting for a Sign" and "Among the Midianites on U.S. 31," Tiferet: A Journal of Spiritual Literature,  Issue 7, Fall 2008, pp. 80–82.
"Lifting the Hajar Heel" p. 84, Language for a New Century: Contemporary Voices from the Middle East, Asia, and Beyond, ed. Carolyn Forche, Ravi Shankar, Tina Chang, Nathalie Handal. W.W. Norton, 2008.
"My Grandmother Washes Her Feet in the Sink of the Bathroom at Sears," "Hijab Scene  #1," "Hijab Scene #2," "Postcards from Hajar," Hayan Charara, ed., Inclined to Speak: Contemporary Arab American Poetry, U of Arkansas Press, 2008, pp. 171–176.
"The Mihrab of the Mind," The Atlanta Review, Fall/Winter 2007, p. 37.
"Sarah's Laugh II" & "Hagar's Ram," Tiferet: A Journal of Spiritual Literature, Issue 5,  2007, p. 15-16.
"On Reading Marge Piercy," Natural Bridge, #16, Fall 2006, p. 55.
"The Ladies on the Stoop" & "Balqis Makes Solomon Sign a Pre-Nup" Pakistani Journal of Women's Studies, Winter 2004
"Pears in the Time of Burnished Gold," in Bascove, ed., Sustenance and Desire: A Food Lover's Anthology of Sensuality and Humor, David R. Godine, 2004, pp. 95–96.
"Copulation in English." Paris Review #164 Winter 2002-2003, p. 76.

Fiction
Novel, The Girl in the Tangerine Scarf 2006, Carroll & Graf
"Manar of Hama,"  "The Spiced Chicken Queen," Pauline Kaldas & Khaled Mattawa, ed., Dinarzad's Children: Arab American Fiction, University of Arkansas Press, 1st Edition, 2005.
"The Girl from Mecca," Feminist Studies, 2012, Issue 38, pp 73–83.

Prose
"Human Rights Is the Hand-Hold, Pass It On," ed. Carolina DeRobertis, Radical Hope: Letters of Love and Dissent in Dangerous Times. Knopf, 2017.
"Human Rights First" Democracy: A Journal of Ideas Fall 2016 #42.
With Maciej Bartkowski, "The Syrian Resistance: a Tale of Two Struggles" OpenDemocracy 23 September 2013.
"Then and Now: The Syrian Revolution to Date," Friends for a Non-Violent World, Saint Paul, Minnesota February 28, 2013.
"Lord, Make Me Not Oblivious," Anne Richards & Iraj Omidvar, Muslims in American Popular Culture, Praeger, Nov. 2013, pp. 425–441.
"Purple Ihram and the Feminine Beatitudes of Hajj," New Geographies, Issue 3, 2011, pp 114–121.
"The Caul of Inshallah," Bill Henderson, ed., 2011 Pushcart Prize XXXV: Best of the Small Presses. Pushcart Prize Fellowships, 2011, pp. 458–461.

Scholarship 
Western Representations of the Muslim Woman: From Termagant to Odalisque 1999 U of Texas Press
"Writing on Muslim Gender Issues in the West Today: Slipping Past the Pity Committee," in Rabab Abdal Hadi, et al, ed., Arab and Arab American Feminisms: Gender, Violence, and Belonging, Syracuse University Press, 2011.
"From Her Royal Body the Robe Was Removed: The Blessings of the Veil and the Trauma of Forced Unveiling in the Middle East," Jennifer Heath, ed., The Veil:Its History, Lore, and Politics, Berkeley: U California Press, April 2008.
"The Silences of Contemporary Syrian Literature" World Literature Today, Spring 2001.
"Politics and Erotics in Nizar Kabbani's Poetry: From the Sultan's Wife to the Lady Friend" World Literature Today, Winter 2000.
"Packaging Huda: Sha'rawi's Memoirs in the US Reading Environment" in Amal Amireh & Lisa Suhair Majaj, ed., Going Global: The Transitional Reception of Third World Women Writers, Garland, 2000.
"Braiding the Stories: Women's Eloquence in the Early Islamic Era" in Gisela Webb, ed., Windows of Faith: Muslim Women's Scholarship and Activism, Syracuse University Press, 2000.

Critical studies on Kahf's work 

Harb, Sirène. "Arab American Women's Writing and September 11: Contrapuntality and Associative Remembering," MELUS (Multi-Ethnic Literature of the United States). Fall 2012, Vol. 37 Issue 3, p13-41.
Harb, Sirène. "Perspectives on Violence and Reconciliation: Arab-American Women's Writing About September 11." Dissidences: Hispanic Journal of Theory and Criticism 4.8 (2012): 1-15.
Fadda-Conrey, Carol. "Arab American Citizenship in Crisis: Destabilizing Representations of Arabs and Muslims in the US after 9/11."  MFS: Modern Fiction Studies, 2011 Fall; 57 (3): 532-555.
Sabiha Sorgun, "'Into the state of pure surrender': Spirituality in Mohja Kahf's The Girl in the Tangerine Scarf," 30th Annual Meeting of Southwest Texas Popular Culture and American Culture Associations, February 25–28, 2009. Albuquerque, NM.
"'Sex and the Umma: Sex and Religion Lived in Mohja Kahf's Columns," Martina Noskova, Theory and Practice in English Studies #4 2005.

See also
 Daniel Abdal-Hayy Moore
 Marvin X

References

External links 
 MacFarquhar, Neil. "She Carries Weapons, They Are Called Words," The New York Times, May 12, 2007.
 Kahf, Mohja. "Spare Me The Sermon On Muslim Women," The Washington Post, October 5, 2008.
 Mohja Kahf Biography, Living Islam Out Loud.
 "The Vigil" Poem performed by Kahf
 "Fayetteville as Fate" performed by Kahf
 "Rivers of Blood: No Metaphor" (poem)
 "Holding Fatima in the Light" (poem)
 "Song of the Fallen Protester" and "To the Free Syrians Behind Bars" 
 “Syrian Americans and the Syrian YouTube Revolution” by Michael May, feature on Mohja Kahf
 

1967 births
American poets
American women poets
American writers of Syrian descent
Living people
Muslim poets
Writers from Damascus
Rutgers University alumni
Syrian emigrants to the United States
Syrian poets
University of Arkansas faculty
Syrian feminists
American feminists
21st-century American poets
American Arabic-language poets
American women academics
21st-century American women writers
American Islamic studies scholars